Sutaşı is a town in Hatay Province, Turkey.

Geography 

Sutaşı is a town in the Samandağ district of Hatay Province. It is situated along the Asi River (known as Orontes in antiquity). It is subject to frequent floods and in 1977 it was renamed as Sutaşı ("water stone") referring to floods. At  it almost merges with Samandağ to the west. The population of the town is 5935 as of 2012.

History 
 
The settlement was annexed by the Ottoman sultan Selim I in 1517 and was lost to France at the end of World War I in 1918. In 1938, together with the rest of Hatay Republic, it was returned to Turkey. In 1955 it was declared a seat of township.

Economy 

The main economic activities in the town are greenhouse and citrus agriculture as well as cattle breeding. Some people are also involved in sericulture.

References

Populated places in Hatay Province
Towns in Turkey
Samandağ District